Kissing Cup is a 1913 British silent sports film directed by Jack Hulcup and starring Harry Gilbey, Chrissie White and Cecil Mannering. The film's title is an allusion to the poem Kissing Cup's Race by Campbell Rae Brown. A jockey manages to escape a gang of kidnappers and makes it to Sandown in time to win his race.

Cast
 Harry Gilbey as Squire Heatherington 
 Chrissie White as Chrissie Heatherington 
 Cecil Mannering as Jack Heatherington  
 Alec Worcester as Richard Cardew  
 John MacAndrews as Ingham - the Trainer  
 Flora Morris as Daisy Ingham  
 Bobby Ingham as Arthur - the Boy Jockey

References

Bibliography
 Palmer, Scott. British Film Actors' Credits, 1895-1987. McFarland, 1988.

External links

1913 films
1910s sports films
British horse racing films
British silent feature films
Films directed by Frank Wilson
British black-and-white films
1910s English-language films
1910s British films
Silent sports films